is a 2020 Japanese superhero kaiju film, serving as the sequel and film adaptation of the 2019 Ultra Series television series Ultraman Taiga. The film originally scheduled to release in Japanese theaters on March 6, 2020 but was withdrawn at the height of COVID-19 pandemic. A month after Japan lifted the state of emergency, the film was given a new release date of August 7, 2020.

Premise
E.G.I.S. member Hiroyuki Kudo has the ability to transform into any three members of the Tri-Squad, Ultramen Taiga, Titas and Fuma as their bond deepened within each battle they experiences. However, Hiroyuki has become the target of an unidentified opponent, forcing other members of the New Generation Heroes to appear one after another and together challenge the power of a great darkness. In addition, Taiga's father, Ultraman Taro, has come to Earth but attacked his own son under mysterious circumstances.

Cast

: 
: 
: 
: 
: 
/: 
/: 
/: 
/: 
: 
/: 
/:

Voice actors
: 
: 
: 
:
: 
: 
: 
: 
: 
:

Theme song

Lyrics, Composition, & Arrangement: 
Artist:

Production 
The film was announced on December 15, 2019 at Tokyo Dome City during Tsuburaya Productions' Tsubucon.

References

External links
 at Tsuburaya Productions 

 

2020s Japanese-language films
Ultra Series films
Crossover tokusatsu films
Films postponed due to the COVID-19 pandemic
2020 films
Films about father–son relationships